is a manga by Hiro Matsuba. It takes place in Heian period in Japan and follows the adventures of Akane, the daughter of a high-ranked official, who enters the imperial court as a servant in order to be closer to her beloved Aogi.

The manga consists of eight volumes and was published in Japan by Mag Garden. ADV Manga published two volumes in the United States in English between 2004 and 2005. As of November 2006, there has been no news of any further publication by ADV.

Volumes

Japanese
  published on September 10, 2002
  published on December 10, 2002
  published on April 10, 2003
  published on September 10, 2003
  published on February 10, 2004
  published on August 10, 2004
  published on January 11, 2005
  published on July 8, 2005

Further reading

External links

2002 manga
ADV Manga
Historical anime and manga
Mag Garden manga
Romance anime and manga
Shōnen manga